Clara Isabel Di Tella (born 10 June 1993) is an Argentine fencer. She won one of the bronze medals in the women's épée event at the 2019 Pan American Games held in Lima, Peru.

In 2010, she competed in the cadet female épée event at the Summer Youth Olympics held in Singapore without winning a medal.

In 2015, she competed in the women's épée and women's team épée events at the Pan American Games held in Toronto, Canada. In both competitions she did not win a medal: in the individual event she was eliminated in her second match by Katharine Holmes of the United States and in the team event Argentina finished in last place.

In 2017, she competed in the women's épée event at the World Fencing Championships held in Leipzig, Germany.

References

External links 
 

Living people
1993 births
Place of birth missing (living people)
Argentine female épée fencers
Fencers at the 2010 Summer Youth Olympics
Pan American Games bronze medalists for Argentina
Pan American Games medalists in fencing
Fencers at the 2015 Pan American Games
Fencers at the 2019 Pan American Games
Medalists at the 2019 Pan American Games
21st-century Argentine women